Marine Marlene Christelle Jurbert (born 11 December 1992) is a French individual and synchronised trampolinist, representing her nation at international competitions.

Career
She took up gymnastics at age four. She made her senior international debut for the French team in 2014 and trains 25 hours per week. She competed at world championships, including at the 2009, 2010, 2011, 2013, 2014 and 2015 Trampoline World Championships. At the 2015 European Games in Baku she won the silver medal in the synchronized event with Joëlle Vallez.

Jurbert competed for France at the 2016 Summer Olympics.

Personal
She lives in Rennes, France.

References

External links
 
 
 
 
 http://www.zimbio.com/photos/Marine+Jurbert/Final+Gymnastics+Qualifier+Aquece+Rio+Test/pVhcCDAQjsK
 http://www.gettyimages.com/detail/news-photo/frances-marine-jurbert-performs-at-the-trampoline-during-news-photo/522486000#frances-marine-jurbert-performs-at-the-trampoline-during-the-artistic-picture-id522486000
 http://www.ueg.org/en/Looking-back-on-Valladolid-with-%E2%80%A6-Marine-Jurbert-(FRA)-2016-04-12-1230

1992 births
Living people
French female trampolinists
Place of birth missing (living people)
Gymnasts at the 2015 European Games
Gymnasts at the 2019 European Games
European Games medalists in gymnastics
European Games silver medalists for France
Gymnasts at the 2016 Summer Olympics
Olympic gymnasts of France
Competitors at the 2009 World Games
21st-century French women